Siri Wålberg (born 17 October 1980 in Oppegård, Norway) is a Norwegian musical artist performing as Sissy Wish.

Career 
Wålberg studied music at Trøndertun Folk High School (1999/2000). In 2003 she won the NRK Urørt competition at by:Larm for the single The Six Feet Tall. The year after she released the album You May Breathe (2004), recipient of the 2004 Spellemannprisen award in the category best Female pop artist. In 2005 she released her second album Tuning In followed up in 2007 with a third album Beauties Never Die.

Honors 
2004: Spellemannprisen in the category best Female pop artist, for the album You May Breathe

Discography

Albums 
2004: You May Breathe... (Bauta Recordings, Tuba Records)
2005: Tuning In (Bauta Recordings, Tuba Records)
2007: Beauties Never Die (Sissy Music, Sony Music)
2013: Happy Monster (SissyMusic)

Singles/EP's 
2003: The Six Feet Tall EP (Bauta Recordings, Tuba Records)
2007: Table 44 7" (Sissy Music)
2008: DWTS 7" (Sissy Music)
2011: Dance All Night With You Single (Sissy Music)

Collaborations 
With Sondre Lerche
2009: Heartbeat Radio  (Rounder Records)

References

External links 
 

1980 births
Living people
Spellemannprisen winners
Norwegian singer-songwriters
Norwegian pop musicians
English-language singers from Norway
People from Oppegård
21st-century Norwegian singers
21st-century Norwegian women singers